Dog Signal (stylized in all caps) is a Japanese manga series written and illustrated by Saya Miyauchi. It has been serialised on Kadokawa's josei manga website Comic Bridge since July 2018, with its chapters collected into nine tankōbon volumes as of January 2023. An anime television series adaptation is set to premiere in Q4 2023.

Media

Manga
Written and illustrated by Saya Miyauchi, Dog Signal began serialization on Kadokawa's josei manga website Comic Bridge on July 24, 2018. As of January 2023, nine tankōbon volumes have been released.

Volume list

Anime
An anime television series adaptation was announced on January 20, 2023. It is set to premiere in Q4 2023 on NHK Educational TV.

Reception
In 2021, the manga was nominated for the Next Manga Awards in the digital category.

References

External links
  
 

2023 anime television series debuts
Anime series based on manga
Comics about dogs
Japanese webcomics
Josei manga
Kadokawa Shoten manga
NHK original programming
Slice of life anime and manga
Upcoming anime television series
Webcomics in print